38th & Blake station (sometimes stylized as 38th•Blake) is a Regional Transportation District (RTD) commuter rail station on the A Line in the Five Points neighborhood of Denver, Colorado. The station is the first station eastbound from Union Station in Downtown Denver and sixth westbound from Denver International Airport. Travel times are about four minutes from Union Station and 33 minutes from Denver Airport.

38th & Blake station is also served by TheRide buses and has a 200-space park-and-ride lot, connected via a pedestrian bridge over freight rail lines.

The station opened on April 22, 2016, along with the rest of the A Line.

38th & Blake station is planned to be the centerpiece to a new, transit-oriented neighborhood that would replace existing industrial buildings with mixed-use buildings for residences, offices and retail. It is also proposed as the northern terminus of the L Line, created by extending the existing terminus north from 30th & Downing station along Downing Street.

References

RTD commuter rail stations in Denver
2016 establishments in Colorado
Railway stations in the United States opened in 2016